The 2002 Pavel Roman Memorial was the 8th edition of an annual international ice dancing competition held in Olomouc, Czech Republic. The event was held between November 19 and 21, 2002. Ice dancers competed in the senior, junior, and novice levels.

Results

Senior

External links
 results

Pavel Roman Memorial, 2002
Pavel Roman Memorial